Henning Wallgren (born 15 August 1968) is a competitive shooter from Norway sponsored by Tanfoglio and after market designer and manufacturer of Tanfoglio Italy pistol parts (distributed in the US by EAA), 1911 - STI and the AR-15 in Longmont Colorado, United States and co-founder of American Zoot Shooters Association.

Merits
 4 time IPSC Nordic Handgun Championship winner 
 2 time USPSA Golden Gate champion
 2 time Canadian IPSC Championship winner
 3 time Norwegian IPSC Champion (Open & Standard) winner
 3 time Rocky Mountain 300 winner
 Czech Euro Open IPSC Standard winner
 USPSA Area 2 2007, 4 Champion
 Winner of Canadian, Hungarian, Slovenian, Swedish, Finnish, Danish, Czech and Swiss IPSC championships
 USPSA State Champion in Arizona, California, Ohio, New Mexico, Colorado, Florida, Nebraska, Texas, Oklahoma, Missouri and Arkansas
 Awarded the King's Trophy of Harald V of Norway for winning the 2004 IPSC Norwegian Handgun Championship, Standard division.
 Placed 2nd at the IPSC European Handgun Championship.
 Placed 2nd at the USPSA Handgun Championship, Open division.
 Placed 5th at the USPSA Multigun Championship
 Placed 6th at the USPSA Handgun Championship, Limited division.

References

1968 births
Living people
IPSC shooters
ISSF pistol shooters
Norwegian male sport shooters
20th-century Norwegian people
21st-century Norwegian people